Edmondthorpe and Wymondham railway station was a station in Wymondham, Leicestershire. It also served the small hamlet of Edmondthorpe. It was Midland Railway property but train services were operated by the Midland and Great Northern Joint Railway. It was closed in 1959 along with most of the M&GN.
Nearby Whissendine railway station on the Leicester to Peterborough line was originally named Wymondham, but had been renamed by 1863.

References

 Track plans and Photographs

Disused railway stations in Leicestershire
Railway stations in Great Britain opened in 1894
Railway stations in Great Britain closed in 1959
Former Midland Railway stations